Koffi Ayinde Idowu Nuel professional known as Koffi, is a Nigerian entertainer, comedian, musician, and actor. Born 11 March 1977 to a Togolese Mother and a Nigerian Father from Ibeju-Lekki.

Early life
Koffi was born in Maroko (an old slum in Lagos, where the New Lekki Oniru sits after it was demolished in 1990). He had his elementary education in Lagos, with secondary education at Molusi College in Ijebu Igbo, Ogun state, He studied Chemistry in the University of Lagos.

Career
He joined Theatre 15 in 1998 and trained as a stage actor, dancer, and comedy opening act.
His first major television breakthrough was as a feature on the hit comedy campus sitcom "Twilight Zone" popularly referred to as "shake body" where he reinvented the Dauda character.
As a standup comic he hosted events regularly about school and opened up before plays ran to a paying student audience and in 2003 he auditioned for the famous Nigerian comedy event "Night of a thousand laughs" where he got chosen as one of the four qualifiers to perform at the annual concert from a total of thirty-four talents. He also delivers in his native Yoruba language.

Filmography 

 Seven (2019 Nigerian film)

Awards

Discography
 COMfussion (2004)
 ABINIBILITY (2006)
 TRADofunkHIPsouL (2008)
 Workerman movement: all eyes open (2010)
 Root&roll: books1&2 (2012)
 Gospel truth (2012)
 Workerman allstars: famous five (2013)
 Ayindeokin: metamorpho (ajala movie sdtrk) (2014)
 Ayindeokin: fresh from the past (2013)
 Motor music (2012)
 2 Black Birds movie soundtrack (2007)
 Mumu movie soundtrack (2009)

References 

Living people
1977 births
Nigerian male comedians
University of Lagos alumni
Nigerian television personalities
People from Lagos
Nigerian people of Togolese descent
Residents of Lagos